Ein Mann, der sich Kolumbus nannt ("A man who called himself Columbus") is the title of a folk or children's song. It first became the melody of Ich bin der Doktor Eisenbart in the Scherzliederbuch (book of humorous songs) Der Pott in 1936. The song tells of the "discovery of America" by Christopher Columbus. Immediately after its first publication, it was widely used in publications of National Socialist organizations. Even after World War II it found its way into German children's song books.

Each verse is made up of four lines separated by the artificial words "widewidewitt bum bum" which act as a rhythmic device. The final lines of each verse consist of: "Gloria, Viktoria, widewidewitt juchheirassa. / Gloria Viktoria, widewidewittt bum bum." which loosely translates into English as: "Glory, Victory, tiddletiddletum Hurrah. / Glory, Victory, tiddletiddletum pum pum."

The song consists of a total of six verses. The artificial word  appears in the Pippi Longstocking song as well as in the Eisenbart Song.

Literature 
 Fritz Jöde: Der Pott. Ein unverschämtes Liederbuch voll Stumpfsinn, Rührseligkeit, Ausgelassenheit und Spott für geborene Kindsköpfe und solche, die es mit der Zeit geworden sind. Kallmeyer, 1936

References 

German children's songs
German-language songs
Songs about Christopher Columbus
Songwriter unknown
Year of song unknown